Ummidia aedificatoria is a species of trap-door spider found in Portugal, Spain and Morocco. It builds a shallow silk-lined trapdoor burrow, similar to those of U. algeriana and U. picea. Only three female specimens have been positively identified, all ranging from 18 to 29 millimeters in length.

References

External links 

Halonoproctidae
Spiders of Europe
Spiders of Africa
Spiders described in 1840